In fluid dynamics, potential flow (or ideal flow) describes the velocity field as the gradient of a scalar function: the velocity potential. As a result, a potential flow is characterized by an irrotational velocity field, which is a valid approximation for several applications. The irrotationality of a potential flow is due to the curl of the gradient of a scalar always being equal to zero.

In the case of an incompressible flow the velocity potential satisfies Laplace's equation, and potential theory is applicable. However, potential flows also have been used to describe compressible flows. The potential flow approach occurs in the modeling of both stationary as well as nonstationary flows.

Applications of potential flow include: the outer flow field for aerofoils, water waves, electroosmotic flow, and groundwater flow. For flows (or parts thereof) with strong vorticity effects, the potential flow approximation is not applicable.

Characteristics and applications

Description and characteristics
In fluid dynamics, a potential flow is described by means of a velocity potential , being a function of space and time. The flow velocity  is a vector field equal to the gradient, of the velocity potential :

Sometimes, also the definition , with a minus sign, is used. But here we will use the definition above, without the minus sign. From vector calculus it is known that the curl of a gradient is equal to zero:

and consequently the vorticity, the curl of the velocity field , is zero:

This implies that a potential flow is an irrotational flow. This has direct consequences for the applicability of potential flow. In flow regions where vorticity is known to be important, such as wakes and boundary layers, potential flow theory is not able to provide reasonable predictions of the flow. Fortunately, there are often large regions of a flow where the assumption of irrotationality is valid which is why potential flow is used for various applications. For instance in: flow around aircraft, groundwater flow, acoustics, water waves, and electroosmotic flow.

Incompressible flow
In case of an incompressible flow — for instance of a liquid, or a gas at low Mach numbers; but not for sound waves — the velocity  has zero divergence:

with the dot denoting the inner product. As a result, the velocity potential  has to satisfy Laplace's equation

where  is the Laplace operator (sometimes also written ). In this case the flow can be determined completely from its kinematics: the assumptions of irrotationality and zero divergence of flow. Dynamics only have to be applied afterwards, if one is interested in computing pressures: for instance for flow around airfoils through the use of Bernoulli's principle.

In two dimensions, potential flow reduces to a very simple system that is analyzed using complex analysis (see below).

Compressible flow

Steady flow
Potential flow theory can also be used to model irrotational compressible flow. The full potential equation, describing a steady flow, is given by:

with Mach number components

where  is the local speed of sound. The full potential equation is valid for sub-, trans- and supersonic flow at arbitrary angle of attack, as long as the assumption of irrotationality is applicable.

In case of either subsonic or supersonic (but not transonic or hypersonic) flow, at small angles of attack and thin bodies, an additional assumption can be made: the velocity potential is split into an undisturbed onflow velocity  in the -direction, and a small perturbation velocity  thereof. So:

In that case, the linearized small-perturbation potential equation — an approximation to the full potential equation — can be used:

with  the Mach number of the incoming free stream. This linear equation is much easier to solve than the full potential equation: it may be recast into Laplace's equation by a simple coordinate stretching in the -direction.

Unsteady flow 
Potential flow theory can also be used to model irrotational compressible flow. The full potential equation, describing a unsteady flow, is given by:

with Mach number components

where  is the local speed of sound. The full potential equation is valid for sub-, trans- and supersonic flow at arbitrary angle of attack, as long as the assumption of irrotationality is applicable.

In case of either subsonic or supersonic (but not transonic or hypersonic) flow, at small angles of attack and thin bodies, an additional assumption can be made: the velocity potential is split into an undisturbed onflow velocity  in the -direction, and a small perturbation velocity  thereof. So:

In that case, the linearized small-perturbation potential equation — an approximation to the full potential equation — can be used:

with  the Mach number of the incoming free stream.

Sound waves 

Small-amplitude sound waves can be approximated with the following potential-flow model:

which is a linear wave equation for the velocity potential . Note that also the oscillatory parts of the pressure  and density  each individually satisfy the wave equation, in this approximation.

Applicability and limitations
Potential flow does not include all the characteristics of flows that are encountered in the real world.  Potential flow theory cannot be applied for viscous internal flows, except for flows between closely spaced plates. Richard Feynman considered potential flow to be so unphysical that the only fluid to obey the assumptions was "dry water" (quoting John von Neumann). Incompressible potential flow also makes a number of invalid predictions, such as d'Alembert's paradox, which states that the drag on any object moving through an infinite fluid otherwise at rest is zero. More precisely, potential flow cannot account for the behaviour of flows that include a boundary layer. Nevertheless, understanding potential flow is important in many branches of fluid mechanics. In particular, simple potential flows (called elementary flows) such as the free vortex and the point source possess ready analytical solutions.  These solutions can be superposed to create more complex flows satisfying a variety of boundary conditions.  These flows correspond closely to real-life flows over the whole of fluid mechanics; in addition, many valuable insights arise when considering the deviation (often slight) between an observed flow and the corresponding potential flow. Potential flow finds many applications in fields such as aircraft design. For instance, in computational fluid dynamics, one technique is to couple a potential flow solution outside the boundary layer to a solution of the boundary layer equations inside the boundary layer. The absence of boundary layer effects means that any streamline can be replaced by a solid boundary with no change in the flow field, a technique used in many aerodynamic design approaches. Another technique would be the use of Riabouchinsky solids.

Analysis for two-dimensional flow

Potential flow in two dimensions is simple to analyze using conformal mapping, by the use of transformations of the complex plane. However, use of complex numbers is not required, as for example in the classical analysis of fluid flow past a cylinder.  It is not possible to solve a potential flow using complex numbers in three dimensions.

The basic idea is to use a holomorphic (also called analytic) or meromorphic function , which maps the physical domain  to the transformed domain .

Now, if we write the mapping  as

Then, because  is a holomorphic or meromorphic function, it has to satisfy the Cauchy–Riemann equations

That is

So the velocity field  is specified by

Both  and  then satisfy Laplace's equation:

Lines of constant  are known as streamlines and lines of constant  are known as equipotential lines (see equipotential surface).

Streamlines and equipotential lines are orthogonal to each other, since

Thus the flow occurs along the lines of constant  and at right angles to the lines of constant .

So the flow is irrotational. The automatic condition  then gives the incompressibility constraint .

Examples of two-dimensional flows

The examples that follow use a variety of elementary functions; special functions may also be used. Note that multi-valued functions such as the natural logarithm may be used, but attention must be confined to a single Riemann surface.

Power laws

The black line is the boundary of the flow, while the darker blue lines are streamlines, and the lighter blue lines are equi-potential lines. Some interesting powers  are:
: this corresponds with flow around a semi-infinite plate,
: flow around a right corner,
: a trivial case of uniform flow,
: flow through a corner, or near a stagnation point, and
: flow due to a source doublet

The constant  is a scaling parameter: its absolute value  determines the scale, while its argument  introduces a rotation (if non-zero).

Power laws with : uniform flow  
This is easiest to see by writing in terms of real and imaginary components:

This flow may be interpreted as uniform flow parallel to the -axis.

Power laws with  

which is a system of rectangular hyperbolae. This may be seen by again rewriting in terms of real and imaginary components. Noting that  and rewriting  and  it is seen (on simplifying) that the streamlines are given by

In fluid dynamics, the flowfield near the origin corresponds to a stagnation point. As no fluid flows across the -axis, it (the -axis) may be treated as a solid boundary. It is thus possible to ignore the flow in the lower half-plane where  and to focus on the flow in the upper halfplane. With this interpretation, the flow is that of a vertically directed jet impinging on a horizontal flat plate. The flow may also be interpreted as flow into a 90 degree corner if the regions specified by (say)  are ignored.

Power laws with  
If , the resulting flow is a sort of hexagonal version of the  case considered above.  Streamlines are given by,  and the flow in this case may be interpreted as flow into a 60° corner.

Power laws with : doublet  
If , the streamlines are given by

This is more easily interpreted in terms of real and imaginary components:

Thus the streamlines are circles that are tangent to the x-axis at the origin. The circles in the upper half-plane thus flow clockwise, those in the lower half-plane flow anticlockwise. This flow pattern is usually referred to as a doublet, or dipole, and can be interpreted as the combination of a source-sink pair of infinite strength kept an infinitesimally small distance apart. The velocity field is given by

or in polar coordinates:

Power laws with : quadrupole 
If , the streamlines are given by

This is the flow field associated with a quadrupole.

Line source and sink

where  in fact is the volume flux per unit length across a surface enclosing the source or sink. The velocity field in polar coordinates are

i.e., a purely radial flow.

Line vortex
A line vortex of strength  is given by

where  is the circulation around any simple closed contour enclosing the vortex. The velocity field in polar coordinates are

i.e., a purely azimuthal flow.

Analysis for three-dimensional flow
For three-dimensional flows, complex potential cannot be obtained.

Point source and sink

where  in fact is the volume flux across a closed surface enclosing the source or sink. The velocity field in spherical polar coordinates are

See also 
Potential flow around a circular cylinder
Aerodynamic potential-flow code
Conformal mapping
Darwin drift
Flownet
Laplacian field
Laplace equation for irrotational flow
Potential theory
Stream function
Velocity potential

Notes

References

Further reading

External links

 
  — Java applets for exploring conformal maps
 Potential Flow Visualizations - Interactive WebApps

Fluid dynamics